Self-Portrait as a Lute Player is a painting by the Italian baroque artist Artemisia Gentileschi. Executed between 1616 and 1618, it hangs in the Wadsworth Atheneum Museum of Art, Hartford, Connecticut, US.

Description 
The artist depicts herself in the guise of a "gypsy-musician", denoted by the headscarf and low-cut blouse; these style of entertainers would have appeared at Italian court performances. The accurate depiction of the lute as well as the finger positioning has led historians to believe that the artist had first-hand experience with the instrument. The composition is closely related to two other contemporaneous depictions of Saint Catherine of Alexandria, which suggests that the artist was using her self-portraits as a means of establishing her reputation in Florence.

History 
It is believed to have been painted for the Medici family in Florence, based on a 1638 inventory of Villa Medici in Artimino. From 1683, its provenance is unknown until it was sold at Sotheby's London in 1998.

References 

1610s paintings
Paintings by Artemisia Gentileschi
Paintings in the Wadsworth Atheneum
Musical instruments in art